The 1926 United States Senate election in California was held on November 2, 1926. Incumbent Republican Senator Samuel Morgan Shortridge was re-elected to a second term.

Republican primary

Candidates
Robert M. Clarke, member of the Los Angeles Harbor Commission
Walter Lineberger, U.S. Representative from Long Beach
Samuel Morgan Shortridge, incumbent Senator

Results

Democratic primary

Candidates
Isidore B. Dockweiler, former Member of the United States Board of Indian Commissioners
John B. Elliott

Campaign
Elliott was endorsed by former Secretary of the Treasury William Gibbs McAdoo, who would win this seat himself in 1932.

Results

General election

Results

See also 
  1926 United States Senate elections

References 

1926 California elections
California
1926